The Changhua County Magistrate is the chief executive of the Changhua County government in Taiwan. Initially magistrates were appointed by the Taiwan Provincial Government, but from 1951 the role has been directly elected by the population of Changhua County. The current magistrate is Wang Huei-mei of Kuomintang since 25 December 2018.

Appointed magistrates

Directly elected magistrates
In the multi-party era (1987 onwards) the post has been held five times by the Kuomintang and thrice by the Democratic Progressive Party. Under current rules magistrates serve four-year terms, and can stand for re-election once.

Timeline

References

Changhua